Summit Records, Inc. is an internationally distributed record label that evolved out of the large brass ensemble Summit Brass in the late 1980s. It was established by David Hickman and Ralph Sauer.

Four Summit Records recordings have been nominated for Grammy Awards, including The Manhattan Transfer Meets Tubby the Tuba in the Best Children's Album category, the Chicago Chamber Musicians were finalists in the Best Chamber Music Performance category, Pete McGuinness in the Best Instrumental Arrangement Accompanying Vocalist for his arrangement of "Smile", and The University of Miami Concert Jazz Bands' recording of "Three Romances" in the category of Best Instrumental Composition.

In 2006 Summit Records took over distributorship of MAMA Records, which was founded in 1990 by Gene Czerwinski, who also founded Cerwin-Vega. It has won three Grammy Awards, including Count Basie Orchestra, Bob Florence, and Randy Brecker.

Roster

 Joseph Alessi
 American Brass Quintet
 Bill Anschell
 Daniel Asia
 Atlantic Brass Quintet
 Michael Conway Baker
 Count Basie Orchestra
 Jeanne Baxtresser
 Tom Brantley
 Randy Brecker
 Calliope
 Kevin Cobb
 Larry Combs
 Jack Cooper
 Les DeMerle
 Dixieland Ramblers
 Dorian Wind Quintet
 Duo46
 Eastman Wind Ensemble
 Extension Ensemble
 Tim Eyermann
 Philip Farkas
 Bob Florence
 David Friesen
 Mark Hetzler
 David Hickman
 Arnold Jacobs
 Stan Kenton Alumni Band
 Ted Kooshian
 Mark Lawrence
 Ronald Leonard
 Dave Liebman
 London Symphony Orchestra
 Matthias Lupri
 John Mack
 Dave MacKay
 Matrix
 Bob McChesney
 Rafael Méndez
 Fred Mills
 Tony Monaco
 Vaughn Nark
 New West Guitar Group
 Gene Pokorny
 River City Brass Band
 Scott Routenberg
 Ralph Sauer
 Carl Saunders
 Bobby Shew
 Phil Smith
 Clark Terry
 Robert Vernon
 Allen Vizzutti
 George Walker
 B.J. Ward
 Harry Watters
 Ken Watters
 Jiggs Whigham
 Anthony Wilson
 Gerald Wilson
 Michele Zukovsky

External links
 Official site
 Interview
 MVD Entertainment Group

American record labels
Jazz record labels
Music companies of the United States
Companies established in 1988